"Magic Man" is a song by the American rock band Heart released as a single off their debut album, Dreamboat Annie. Written and composed by Ann and Nancy Wilson, the song is sung from the viewpoint of a young girl who is being seduced by an older man (referred to as a Magic Man), much to the chagrin of her mother, who calls and begs the girl to come home. In an interview, Ann Wilson revealed that the "Magic Man" was her then boyfriend, band manager Michael Fisher, and that part of the song was an autobiographical tale of the beginnings of their relationship. The album version of "Magic Man" features an over-two-minute instrumental break which consists a guitar solo and the usage of a Minimoog synthesizer, while the single version of the song edits out most of this break, cutting it down from 5:28 to 3:29. 

Cash Box said that "a funk rhythm is established quickly with some screaming guitar licks, and the vocal, handled by the female lead, plays well against the arrangement."  Record World said that "The beguiling vocal sound of ['Crazy on You'] is duplicated here and accompanied by sumptuous guitar work that should steer it to the top."

"Magic Man" was originally released in Canada in June 1975 as the second single from the yet-to-be released Dreamboat Annie, the first single having been the folksy "How Deep It Goes". "Magic Man" spent 9 weeks on the RPM Singles Chart peaking at number 62 on August 16, 1975. The success of "Magic Man" prompted the release of the album and, in March 1976, a third single, "Crazy on You". After "Crazy on You" had a chart run, "Magic Man" gained popularity in new areas of the country almost a full year later and re-entered the RPM Singles Chart on September 11, 1976 for 14 weeks peaking at number 26 on October 30, 1976. 

In America, "Magic Man" received its first release in summer 1976, after the first US single "Crazy on You" had primed audiences to the group's sound. It became Heart's first Top 10 hit, peaking at No. 9 on the Billboard Hot 100 on November 6, 1976. In the Netherlands and Belgium, "Magic Man" was the first single released from the album, that being in late 1976, and it peaked at number 7 and 10, respectively, in early 1977. It was also successful in Australia where it peaked at number 6 while it reached number 26 in nearby New Zealand.

Personnel
Ann Wilson – lead vocals
Nancy Wilson – rhythm guitar, acoustic guitar, backing vocals
Roger Fisher – lead guitar, acoustic guitar
Steve Fossen – bass guitar
Howard Leese – rhythm guitar, Minimoog

Additional musicians
Dave Wilson – drums
Ray Ayotte – conga
Mike Flicker – percussion

Charts

Weekly charts

Year-end charts

References 

1976 singles
Heart (band) songs
American hard rock songs
Songs written by Nancy Wilson (rock musician)
Songs written by Ann Wilson
Mushroom Records singles
1976 songs
Song recordings produced by Mike Flicker